Black Midi (stylised black midi) are an English rock band from London, formed in 2017 and currently consisting of Geordie Greep (vocals, guitar, piano, synths, accordion), Cameron Picton (vocals, bass, synths, flute, guitar), and Morgan Simpson (drums). The trio have been frequently joined by Seth Evans (keyboards, synths) and Kaidi Akinnibi (saxophone) in both studio and live performances since 2020. Their name is derived from the Japanese electronic music genre black MIDI, though their own music has no relation to it, instead incorporating styles such as math rock, progressive rock, post-punk, and avant-jazz.

The band began on producer Dan Carey's record label Speedy Wunderground, through which they released their debut single "bmbmbm" in 2018. They released their debut studio album Schlagenheim, produced by Carey, on 21 June 2019, through Rough Trade Records. It received critical acclaim, entered the top 50 of the UK Albums Chart, and was nominated for the 2019 Mercury Prize. An anthology album including several recorded jams and spoken word tracks, The Black Midi Anthology Vol. 1: Tales of Suspense and Revenge, was released on 5 June 2020 exclusively to Bandcamp. In January 2021, founding member Matt Kwasniewski-Kelvin went on hiatus from the group for health reasons. The band's second studio album, Cavalcade, was released  on 26 May 2021. Their third studio album, Hellfire, was released on 15 July 2022.

History

Formation and first singles (2015–2019)
Prior to the formation of the band, Geordie Greep had separate jam sessions with Matt Kwasniewski-Kelvin and Morgan Simpson, all of whom (alongside Cameron Picton) were attending BRIT School. Simpson was an accomplished drummer, winning the "Young Drummer of the Year" award in 2014. In 2016 Greep and Kwasniewski-Kelvin enlisted Simpson to form a band, with Greep and Kelvin on guitar and vocals, and with Simpson on drums. Picton joined later, on bass guitar, to complete the line-up. The band played their first gig at Brixton's The Windmill on 12 June 2017, supporting the band Leg Puppy, and would later go on to have a residency at the venue.

On 8 June 2018, the group released their debut single titled "bmbmbm" released on producer Dan Carey's record label Speedy Wunderground. On 26 September 2018, a cassette was released featuring segments of a performance with Damo Suzuki which took place on 5 May 2018 at The Windmill. On 9 November 2018, Black Midi performed five songs from their then untitled upcoming album, live at Kex Hostel in Reykjavik, Iceland, during the music festival Iceland Airwaves. The eccentric performance, which was recorded for the Seattle radio station KEXP, was praised online and became popular on YouTube, exposing the band to listeners internationally. The band contributed the song "Ice Cream" featuring Jerskin Fendrix on vocals for a Brixton Hillbilly compilation album, released 7 December 2018. On 23 January 2019, the group released their second single, "Speedway". A 12" vinyl record was released featuring remixes by Proc Fiskal, Kwake Bass, and Blanck Mass.

Schlagenheim and other projects (2019–2020)

In January 2019 the group announced that they had signed to Rough Trade Records. The group released two singles on the label in March and April 2019, "Crows Perch" and "Talking Heads" respectively. On 14 May, the group announced their debut album titled Schlagenheim, which was released 21 June 2019. The album was recorded in 2018 with producer Dan Carey, who became impressed by the band at an early live show. Instead of merely recreating their live show, they chose to augment their sound with piano, accordion, synthesisers, banjo, and drum machines. "The idea was to do stuff that's impossible to do live", frontman Greep explained. "If the album and the gig are just the same, it's a bit sad." The majority of the album was recorded in just five days. At Metacritic, a website that assigns a weighted mean rating out of 100 to reviews from mainstream publications, Schlagenheim received a score of 82, based on 20 reviews, indicating "universal acclaim". The album was later nominated for the 2019 Mercury Prize.

On 7 March 2020, the band performed live at the BBC Radio 6 Music festival in Camden. In June 2020, the band released a jam and spoken word album via Bandcamp entitled The Black Midi Anthology Vol. 1: Tales of Suspense and Revenge, consisting of four short stories read by the members of the band over jam instrumentals as well as three instrumental mixes mostly taken from the same recordings as the spoken word tracks. On 16 June 2020, the band began hosting a monthly radio show called The Black Midi Variety Hour on NTS Radio. Six episodes have been produced so far. On 10 December 2020, the band performed a show with the group Black Country, New Road under the alias Black Midi, New Road as a charity gig for live venue The Windmill, Brixton. The show was livestreamed from The Windmill's Bandcamp page with an entry fee of £5. The group have performed under the Black Midi, New Road moniker at the venue before.

Kwasniewski-Kelvin's hiatus, Cavalcade and Hellfire (2021–present)

On 15 January 2021, Black Midi announced through social media that their guitarist Matt Kwasniewski-Kelvin had been taking time off from the band due to mental health issues and that he is not featured on forthcoming material from the band. The band announced their second studio album, Cavalcade, on 23 March 2021, which was released on 26 May 2021. On the day of the announcement, they also released the album's lead single, "John L", backed with the non-album track "Despair". Kwasniewski-Kelvin appears on the album only as composer on a couple of tracks; he was not part of the recording process. Touring members Akinnibi and Evans were a part of the album's recording sessions. A second single, "Slow", was released on 28 April and corresponded with a second KEXP performance released the same day. This performance features Evans and Akinnibi as well as a small brass section.

The band toured Europe and the US in throughout 2021 and have announced dates for a 2022 tour. The band has also opened for themselves at concerts as an alter ego group known as "Orange Tree Boys", touted as a funk blues band from Las Vegas.

On 22 March 2022, the band released the digital EP Cavalcovers, a collection of cover versions of songs by King Crimson, Taylor Swift and Captain Beefheart originally released as flexi-disc bonus records with pre-ordered vinyl copies of Cavalcade.

On 9 May 2022, they released "Welcome to Hell", the lead single from their third album Hellfire. They released "Eat Men Eat", the second single from the album, on 15 June 2022. On 12 July, the third single, "Sugar/Tzu" was released. Hellfire was released on 15 July 2022 and charted at No. 22 in the United Kingdom, their highest placement yet. It also became their first album to chart in the United States, reaching No. 139.

In fall 2022, Black Midi announced the "Back in Black Tour" supported by Black Country, New Road in the United States.

Musical style
The band's sound has been variously labeled as experimental rock, art rock, progressive rock, math rock, post-punk, and avant-prog.

Members
Current members
 Geordie Greep – lead vocals, guitar, bass (2017–present)
 Cameron Picton – lead vocals, bass, synths, samples, guitar (2017–present)
 Morgan Simpson – drums (2017–present)
Past members
 Matt Kwasniewski-Kelvin – guitar, occasional main vocals (2017–2020; on hiatus)
Touring and session members
 Seth Evans – keyboards, synths (2020–present)
 Kaidi Akinnibi – tenor saxophone, alto clarinet (2020–present)

Timeline

Discography

Studio albums

Compilations

Extended plays

Live albums/EPs

Singles

Other appearances

Music videos

Awards and nominations

References

External links
 

English noise rock groups
Math rock groups
2017 establishments in England
English experimental rock groups
Rough Trade Records artists
People educated at the BRIT School